Holzheim is a municipality in the district of Donau-Ries in Bavaria in Germany.

The community had 1,012 inhabitants in 1970, 1,006 in 1987, and 1,145 in 2000.

References

Donau-Ries